Diego Tavera Ponce de Léon (died 1560) was a Roman Catholic prelate who served as Bishop of Jaén (1555–1560).

Biography
On 17 July 1555, he was appointed during the papacy of Pope Paul IV as Bishop of Jaén.
He served as Bishop of Jaén until his death on 28 April 1560.

References

External links and additional sources
 (for Chronology of Bishops)
 (for Chronology of Bishops)

16th-century Roman Catholic bishops in Spain
Bishops appointed by Pope Paul IV
1560 deaths